Alipur is a village in Gaya district, in the state of Bihar, in eastern India.

Overview
Alipur is a village located 9 km from the commercial town of Tikari in Gaya district in Bihar, India. Alipur has a population of 4,825 as of 2011.  Alipur village has a marketplace. The local police station was established in 2001. Here, there is a government school up to class 8 as well as a government hospital is also established here.
Alipur is a big marketplace for the nearby villages. 
The Mukhiya of Chaita Panchayat (Smt Mini Devi) is from Alipur.
Alipur's economy is primarily agricultural. However, some people own businesses and others have jobs in the public and private sectors. Alipur has its own marketplace. Some people from the village have businesses there. Tekari is about 9 km away and serves as a larger market for goods and services that Alipur cannot provide. The city of Gaya is about 25 km to the east of Alipur and is well connected by state highway.

There is a small government school, a petrol pump, Gas Godown and five Hindu temples in the village. The nearest hospital is in Tekari but there are a few pharmacies in the market of  Alipur village.

Religion
Alipur Village is home to a number of Hindu temples, namely:
Shiv Temple
Thakurbari
Devi Maa
Sankat Mochan Hanuman Mandir
Sun Temple
Ram Janki Mandir (under construction)

Geography
Alipur is located at 24.93°N 84.83°E. It has an average elevation of 82 metres (269 feet). It is located near the boundary of the Gaya district. The Village is bounded on the southeast by the Jahanabad district, on the south by Keshpa Village, on the west by Arwal, and on the northwest by Tikari Town.
Alipur is 9 km from the city of Tekari, and is connected via a link road to the main road connecting Gaya to Jehanabad.

Demographics
The village has a sizeable population of the Bhumihar caste

References

Dayanand Kumar village Alipur Mob 9451909080

Villages in Gaya district